The following outline is provided as an overview of and topical guide to Saint Helena:

Saint Helena, named after St Helena of Constantinople, is an island of volcanic origin in the South Atlantic Ocean. It is part of the British overseas territory of Saint Helena, Ascension and Tristan da Cunha which also includes Ascension Island and the islands of Tristan da Cunha.

General reference 

 ISO country codes:  SH, SHN, 654
 ISO region codes:  See ISO 3166-2:SH
 Internet country code top-level domain:  .sh

Geography of Saint Helena 

Geography of Saint Helena
 Saint Helena is: an island and part of the British overseas territory of Saint Helena, Ascension and Tristan da Cunha
 Location:
 Southern Hemisphere and Western Hemisphere
 Atlantic Ocean
 South Atlantic
 Time zone:  Greenwich Mean Time (UTC+00)
 Extreme points of Saint Helena
 High:  Queen Mary's Peak on Tristan da Cunha  – highest peak in South Atlantic Ocean        Green Mountain on Ascension Island         Diana's Peak on Saint Helena 
 Low:  South Atlantic Ocean 0 m
 Land boundaries:  none
 Coastline:  South Atlantic Ocean
 Population of Saint Helena: 6,600  - 215th most populous country

 Area of Saint Helena: 420 km2
 Atlas of Saint Helena

Environment of Saint Helena 

 Climate of Saint Helena
 Wildlife of Saint Helena
 Flora of Saint Helena
 Fauna of Saint Helena
 Birds of Saint Helena
 Mammals of Saint Helena
 Insects of Saint Helena
 Saint Helena earwig

Regions of Saint Helena

Administrative divisions of Saint Helena 

 Districts
 Alarm Forest
 Blue Hill
 Half Tree Hollow
 Jamestown
 Levelwood
 Longwood — district where Napoleon was exiled from 1815 until his death on 5 May 1821.
 France owns the land around Napoleon's original grave, but the United Kingdom retains full sovereignty.
 St. Paul's
 Sandy Bay
 Municipalities (cities, towns, etc.)
 Towns in Saint Helena
 Jamestown — Capital of Saint Helena

Demography of Saint Helena 

Demographics of Saint Helena

Government and politics of Saint Helena 

Politics of Saint Helena
 Form of government: parliamentary representative democratic dependency
 Capital of Saint Helena: Jamestown
 Elections in Saint Helena
 Political parties in Saint Helena

Branches of the government of Saint Helena

Executive branch of the government of Saint Helena 
 Head of state: Monarch of the United Kingdom, King Charles III
 Monarch's representative: Governor of Saint Helena,
 Head of government: Governor of Saint Helena
 Cabinet: Executive Council of Saint Helena

Legislative branch of the government of Saint Helena 

 Legislative Council of Saint Helena (unicameral)

Judicial branch of the government of Saint Helena 

Court system of Saint Helena
 Supreme Court of Saint Helena

Foreign relations of Saint Helena 

 Diplomatic missions of Saint Helena

International organization membership of Saint Helena 
Saint Helena is a member of:
Universal Postal Union (UPU)
World Federation of Trade Unions (WFTU)

Law and order in Saint Helena 
 Human rights in Saint Helena
 LGBT rights in Saint Helena
 Law enforcement in Saint Helena
 Saint Helena Police Service

Military of Saint Helena 
 Commander-in-Chief: Governor of Saint Helena

History of Saint Helena 

History of Saint Helena

Culture of Saint Helena 

 Architecture of Saint Helena
 Briars
 Longwood House
 Cuisine of Saint Helena
 National symbols of Saint Helena
 Coat of arms of Saint Helena
 Flag of Saint Helena
 Unofficial territorial anthem: My Saint Helena Island
 Public holidays in Saint Helena, Ascension and Tristan da Cunha
 Religion in Saint Helena
 Christianity in Saint Helena
 Diocese of St Helena
 Roman Catholicism in Saint Helena
 Scouting and Guiding on Saint Helena and Ascension Island
 Sport in Saint Helena
 Saint Helena, Ascension and Tristan da Cunha at the 2010 Commonwealth Games
 Saint Helena national cricket team
 World Heritage Sites in Saint Helena: None

Economy and infrastructure of Saint Helena 

Economy of Saint Helena
 Economic rank, by nominal GDP (2007):
 Communications in Saint Helena
 Radio Saint Helena
Currency: — Saint Helena has its own currency
 Saint Helena pound
 Coins of the Saint Helena pound — Saint Helena mints its own coins
ISO 4217: SHP
 Transport on Saint Helena
 Airports in Saint Helena
 Saint Helena Airport
 Rail transport in Saint Helena

Education in Saint Helena 

 Education in Saint Helena

See also 

Saint Helena
 Outline of geography
 Outline of the United Kingdom
 Outline of Africa
 Outline of Ascension Island
 Outline of Tristan da Cunha
 List of international rankings

References

External links 

 The first website on St Helena — since 1995
 The Official Government Website of Saint Helena
 The Official Government Website of Ascension Island
 The Official Tristan da Cunha Website
 
 All about St Helena in the South Atlantic Ocean
 St Helena Online - Web Portal to the Island of St Helena, which includes discussion forums
 Webcam showing Jamestown
 The Friends of St Helena
 The St Helena Institute - Dedicated to St Helena and Dependencies research since 1997

 
Saint Helena